Da Manuela a Pensami is a 1978 album by Spanish singer Julio Iglesias.
The album was certified gold by the Federation of the Italian Music Industry.

Track listing
Manuela (Italian) 3:21 
Da quando sei tornata 3:04 
Bimba 4:00
Quella di sempre 3:28 
Caminito 3:32 
Se mi lasci, non vale 3:00 
A Eleonora perchè è un fiore 4:00 
Anima ribelle 3:16 
Non rimane che un addio 3:34 
Solamente una vez 3:37 
Sono un pirata, sono un signore 3:00 
Un amore a matita 3:02 
Restiamo ancora insieme 4:07 
Passar di mano 3:42 
Guantanamera 3:45
Pensami 4:04 
Piccole grandi cose 3:41
La ragazza di Ypacarai 3:59 
Quel punto in più 2:52 
De un mundo raro 3:12

Certifications

References

1978 albums
Julio Iglesias albums
Spanish-language albums